Andrzej Gąsienica Daniel (13 March 1932 – 31 August 1991) was a Polish ski jumper. He competed in the individual event at the 1956 Winter Olympics.

References

1932 births
1991 deaths
Polish male ski jumpers
Olympic ski jumpers of Poland
Ski jumpers at the 1956 Winter Olympics
Sportspeople from Zakopane
20th-century Polish people